Ritson's Northumberland Garland or Newcastle Nightingale, Edited and published by Joseph Ritson, is a revised edition of a book on Northumberland music, published in 1809.

Details 

 Ritson's Northumberland Garland or Newcastle Nightingale 1809  (or to give its full title – "The Northumberland Garland; or Newcastle Nightingale: A matchless collection of famous songs [As originally edited by the late Joseph Ritson, Esq.] ----Old Tyne shall listen to my tale, and echo, down the bordering vale, The liquid melody prolong.           Akenside ---- Newcastle ---- MDCCXCIII Printed by and for Hall and Elliot. Licensed and entered according to Order ---- London: Reprinted for Robert Triphook, 37, St. Jame's Street, by Harding and Wright, St John's Square ---- 1809”) is a book of Geordie folk song consisting of approximately 96 pages with 16 works, first published in 1793 and reprinted (this version) in 1809.

Other books in Ritson's Garland series were Bishopric Garland, The Yorkshire Garland, and The North-Country Chorister. A compilation of the whole series, entitled The Northern Garland was published in 1810.

The “Garland” series were important, not only as important document in their own right, but as one of the main sources of similar successor publications such as John Bell's Rhymes of Northern Bards and Bruce and Stokoe's Northumbrian Minstrelsy.

A set of original documents are held in The Robinson Library of Newcastle University

The publication 
The front cover of the book was as thus :-

THE<br/ >
NORTHUMBERLAND GARLAND; <br/ >
OR<br/ >
NEWCASTLE NIGHTINGALE: <br/ >
A<br/ >
MATCHLESS COLLECTION<br/ >
OF<br/ >
FAMOUS SONGS<br/ >
[AS ORIGINALLY EDITED<br/ > 
BY THE LATE JOSEPH RITSON, ESQ.] <br/ >
– - – - – - -<br/ >
OLD TYNE SHALL LISTEN TO MY TALE, <br/ >
AND ECHO, DOWN THE BORDERING VALE, <br/ >
THE LIQUID MELODY PROLONG.     AKENSIDE<br/ >
– - – - – - -<br/ >
NEWCASTLE<br/ >
PRINTED BY AND FOR HALLL AND ELLIOT. <br/ >
MDCCXCIII<br/ >
Licensed and entered according to Order<br/ >
– - – - – - -<br/ >
LONDON: <br/ >
REPRINTED FOR ROBERT TRIPHOOK, 37, ST. JAME'S STREET. <br/ >
By Harding and Wright, St. John's-square. <br/ >
– - – - – - -<br/ >
1809

Contents 
are as below :-<br/ >

Notes 
Tune-BS -The tune is not given in the book – but it has been added as attributed in Northumbrian Minstrelsy by Bruce and Stokoe, 1882

See also 
Geordie dialect words
Joseph Ritson
Ritson's Northern Garlands 1810<br/ >
Ritson's Bishopric Garland or Durham Minstrel 1792
Ritson's Yorkshire Garland 1809
Ritson's North-Country Chorister 1809

References

External links
 Farne archives – front cover
 Allan’s Illustrated Edition of Tyneside songs and readings – page 512
 Google e-book Northern Garland
 Google e-book

Books by Joseph Ritson
Songs related to Newcastle upon Tyne
Northumbrian folklore
Chapbooks
Song books